The 1986 World Junior Figure Skating Championships were held on December 9–14, 1985 in Sarajevo, SFR Yugoslavia. The event was sanctioned by the International Skating Union and open to ISU member nations. Medals were awarded in the disciplines of men's singles, ladies' singles, pair skating, and ice dancing.

Results

Men

Ladies

Pairs

Ice dancing

References

1986
1985 in figure skating
International figure skating competitions hosted by Yugoslavia
Sports competitions in Sarajevo
1986 World Junior Figure Skating Championships
1985 in Bosnia and Herzegovina
1985 in Yugoslav sport
December 1985 sports events in Europe